Ugo Perez (born 30 November 1994) is a French professional rugby league footballer who plays as a  forward for the Pia Baroudeurs in the Elite Two Championship.

Perez is a French international.

He was previously on loan at Whitehaven in the Championship.

References

External links
Catalans Dragons profile
SL profile

1994 births
Living people
AS Saint Estève players
Baroudeurs de Pia XIII players
Catalans Dragons players
France national rugby league team players
French rugby league players
Rugby league second-rows
Sportspeople from Pyrénées-Orientales
Toulouse Olympique players
Whitehaven R.L.F.C. players